Jean-François Kebe N'guema (born 14 October 1994) is an Ivorian professional basketball player for Hermine Nantes Basket. Born in France, he represents the Ivorian national team.

He represented the Ivory Coast at the FIBA AfroBasket 2021, where the team won the silver medal.

References

External links

1994 births
Living people
Ivorian expatriate basketball people in France
Ivorian men's basketball players
Saint-Quentin Basket-Ball players
Shooting guards
Sportspeople from Nantes
Hermine Nantes Basket players
Alliance Sport Alsace players
BC Orchies players